José Gómez de Navia (1757, San Ildefonso - after 1812, Madrid) was a Spanish engraver and draftsman.

Life and works 
He began his studies with Manuel Salvador Carmona at the Real Academia de Bellas Artes de San Fernando and won a prize for engraving in 1784.

He tried several new methods of engraving, and introduced the technique known as "stippling", which he used in his Collection of Devout Heads, Taken from Paintings by Famous Artists  (1794), and in his portrait of Diego Hurtado de Mendoza in the Portraits of Illustrious Spaniards.
 
His culminating work is the Collection of Different Views of the Magnificent Temple and Royal Monastery of San Lorenzo de El Escorial, Factory of the Catholic and Prudent King Felipe II, built by the Distinguished Architects Juan Bautista de Toledo and Juan de Herrera his Disciple , which he undertook on his own initiative. In a letter addressed to the Academia in 1800, he noted that he was short of work and, pursuing his fondness for drawing, spent the summer sketching at El Escorial. King Charles IV was so pleased with them, he commissioned more, depicting Aranjuez, and provided an annual pension of 300 ducats.

Similar projects followed, with the engravings done by Alegre,  and Alonso García Sanz (c. 1781-c. 1819). His last known work was a series entitled Collection of the Best Views and Most Sumptuous Buildings in Madrid (1812).

References

Further reading 
 Juan Carrete Parrondo, Diccionario de grabadores y litógrafos que trabajaron en España. Siglos XIV a XIX

External links 

 Digitalized works in the Biblioteca Digital Hispánica of the  Biblioteca Nacional de España

1757 births
1810s deaths
Spanish engravers
Spanish illustrators
People from the Province of Segovia